The Irish Parachute Club (IPC) is located in Clonbullogue, County Offaly, in Ireland. It was founded in 1956 by wartime paratrooper Freddie Bond and began operations at Weston airfield in Leixlip. In December 1959, the IPC organised emergency supply drops to the islands of Inishturk, Inishturbot and Inishark. In February 1963, the club organised emergency supply drops over the Wicklow Mountains during the severe winter of that year.

The IPC trained several teams that competed internationally in 1962, 1964 and 1966, and at many international events during the last 20 years. IPC-trained skydivers participated in several world records.

The club later operated from a number of locations before establishing a drop zone in 1974 at Tokn Grass, west of Edenderry. The first club aircraft, a Cessna 172, was purchased in the same year.
In 1981, IPC-based team Gael Force competed internationally.
In 1983, a Cessna 206 was purchased and, in 1988, the club moved to its current location at Clonbullogue Airfield. 
Most Irish skydiving records have been set at this location, including a 51 person formation in July 2008.

There have been important developments more recently including the construction of hangars and other buildings and the purchase of a PAC P-750 XSTOL turbine aircraft. Averaging over twelve thousand jumps annually, the IPC operates on weekends, bank holidays, and on some weekdays in summer; and offers tandem skydiving, Accelerated Free Fall (AFF), and static line parachuting training programmes.

A list of tax defaulters for the fourth quarter of 2021 published by the Revenue Commissioners on 8 March 2022 revealed that Irish Parachute Club Limited at The Airfield, Clonbullogue, County Offaly had paid a settlement of €113,446.47 comprising €65,134.15 tax, €28,772.07 interest, and €19,540.25 penalties for the underdeclaration of Pay As You Earn (PAYE) tax, Pay Related Social Insurance (PRSI), and 
Universal Social Charge (USC).

Airfield
Clonbullogue Airfield has one grass strip runway running east-west which is 770 m long and 18 m wide.

References

External links 
 Irish Parachute Club
 Parachute Association of Ireland Ltd.

Sports clubs in the Republic of Ireland
Parachuting organizations